Bee Journal is a 2012 poetry collection by Sean Borodale. It is written in the form of a journal and follows one colony for around one year, from the initial formation of the hive to the capture of a swarm.

Reception
A review in The Daily Telegraph of Bee Journal described it as "the most beautiful expression of what it is like to live with bees that you could hope to find.". Granta compared it to The Life of the Bee by Maurice Maeterlinck. It has also been reviewed by Varsity.

Bee Journal was shortlisted for the 2012 T S Eliot Prize, and  the 2012 Costa Poetry Award.

References

2012 poetry books
Bees in popular culture
English poetry collections
Jonathan Cape books